Ken Gill may refer to:

Ken Gill (1927–2009), British trade unionist
Ken Gill (bishop) (1932–2013), English Anglican bishop
Ken Gill (rugby league), English rugby league footballer